The Faravahar, also known as the Foruhar or the Farre Kiyâni, is one of the best-known symbols of Zoroastrianism, an Iranian religion. There are various interpretations of what the Faravahar symbolizes, and there is no concrete universal consensus on its meaning. However, it is commonly believed that the Faravahar serves as a Zoroastrian depiction of the fravashi, or personal spirit.

The Faravahar is one of the best-known and most used pre-Islamic symbols of Iran and is often worn as a pendant. Despite its traditionally religious nature, it has become a secular and cultural symbol for Iranians.

Etymology
The New Persian word  is read as foruhar or faravahar (pronounced as furōhar or furūhar in Classical Persian). The Avestan language form was fravaṣ̌i.

History

The pre-Zoroastrian use of the symbol originates as the winged sun used by various powers of the Ancient Near East, primarily those of Ancient Egypt and Mesopotamia. The Zoroastrian adoption of the symbol comes from its prevalence in Neo-Assyrian iconography. This Assyrian image often includes their Tree of Life, which includes the god Ashur on a winged disk.

In Zoroastrian culture 

The faravahar was depicted on the tombs of Achaemenid kings, such as Darius the Great and Artaxerxes III. The symbol was also used on some of the coin mints of the frataraka of Persis in the late 3rd and early 2nd BC centuries. Even after the Arab conquest of Iran, Zoroastrianism continued to be part of Iranian culture. Throughout the year, festivities are celebrated such as Nowruz, Mehregan, and Chaharshanbe Suri which relate to Zoroastrian festivals and calendar. These are remnants of Zoroastrian traditions. From the start of the 20th century, the faravahar icon found itself in public places and became a known icon among Iranians. The Shahnameh by Ferdowsi is Iran's national epic and contains stories (partly historical and partly mythical) from pre-Islamic Zoroastrian times. The tomb of Ferdowsi (built early 1930), which is visited by numerous Iranians every year, contains the faravahar icon as well.

Whilst being used by both modern day Zoroastrians and Persians, it is important to note the symbol is neither Zoroastrian nor Persian in its origin. It originates as a Mesopotamian Assyrian depiction of the wing deity Ashur. After the Achaemenian dynasty, the image of the farohar was no longer present in Persian art or architecture. The Parthians, Sassanians and Islamic kings that followed did not use the image. It was not until the 20th century, over 2000 years later, that the symbol re-emerged thanks to the work of Parsi scholar, Jamshedji Maneckji Unvala, who published two articles in 1925 and 1930.

Unvala's work was discredited by Irach Jehangir Sorabji Taraporewala, who refuted the idea that the winged figure represented Ahura Mazda. Taraporewala suggested that the figures used in Persian reliefs were meant to depict khvarenah or royal glory to reflect the perceived divine empowerment of kings, and, therefore, has no true spiritual meaning. This view was later supported by Alireza Shapour Shahbazi and Mary Boyce.

Modern age usage 
The Sun Throne, the imperial seat of Iran, has visual implications of the Farahavar. The sovereign would be seated in the middle of the throne, which is shaped like a platform or bed that is raised from the ground. This religious-cultural symbol was adapted by the Pahlavi dynasty to represent the Iranian nation. In modern Zoroastrianism, one of the interpretations of the faravahar is that it is a representation of the human soul and its development along with a visual guide of good conduct. Another popular interpretation is that it is a visual representation of a Fravashi, though Fravashis are described in Zoroastrian literature as being feminine. One of the most prevalent views in academia as to the meaning of the faravahar is that it represents Khvarenah, the divine power and royal glory. Although there are a number of interpretations of the individual elements of the symbol, most are recent interpretations and there is still debate as to its meaning.

After the Islamic Revolution of 1979, the Lion and Sun, which was part of Iran's original national flag, was banned by the government from public places. Nevertheless, faravahar icons were not removed and as a result, the faravahar icon became a national symbol for Iranians, and it became tolerated by the government as opposed to the Lion and Sun. The winged disc has a long history in the art, religion, and culture of the ancient Near and Middle East, being about 4000 years old in usage and noted as also symbolizing Ashur, Shamash, and other deities.

Gallery

Citations

General sources

External links 
 

Kurdish mythology
National symbols of Iran
Persian words and phrases
Zoroastrian symbols